Dolaigaon is a locality in Bongaigaon, surrounded by localities of Paglasthan, Dhaligaon and Kukurmari with nearest railway station, New Bongaigaon railway station at New Bongaigaon.

3G Services
Aircel, Airtel, BSNL 3G services available in this locality.

See also
 Paglasthan
 Borpara, Bongaigaon
 Chapaguri, Bongaigaon
 Dhaligaon
 New Bongaigaon
 Mahabeersthan
 BOC Gate, Bongaigaon

References

Neighbourhoods in Bongaigaon